Goodbye 20th Century: A Biography of Sonic Youth is a 2009 biography on the American alternative rock band Sonic Youth, written by David Browne. It was published by Da Capo Press.

External links 

 Huffington Post review of the book
 Los Angeles Times article on the book

2009 non-fiction books
Da Capo Press books
Biographies about musicians